Whetstone Gulf State Park is a  state park located in Lewis County, New York. The park is on the edge of the Tug Hill Plateau, south of Lowville, on the border of the towns of Turin and Martinsburg. The east end of the park is located near New York State Route 26.

Park description
Above the gorge is Whetstone Reservoir, stocked with tiger muskie and largemouth bass for fishermen.

The park offers 62 campsites, 20 of which include electric hookups. Areas for fishing, a picnic area along Whetstone Creek, a man-made swimming area, and a playground are also available. Trails for hiking and cross-country skiing are found throughout the park, including a  loop around the rim of the gorge.

See also
 List of New York state parks

References

External links
 New York State Parks: Whetstone Gulf State Park
 Whetstone Gulf State Park trail map

State parks of New York (state)
Parks in Lewis County, New York